The 2015 South American Rhythmic Gymnastics Championships were held in Cochabamba, Bolivia, October 8–11, 2015. The competition was organized by the Bolivian Gymnastics Federation and approved by the International Gymnastics Federation.

Medalists

References 

2015 in gymnastics
Rhythmic Gymnastics,2015|
International gymnastics competitions hosted by Bolivia
2015 in Bolivian sport